This is a list of products manufactured by the multinational pharmaceutical, biologics, and vaccines manufacturing company GSK.

Pharmaceutical products

 Adartrel (ropinirole hydrochloride)
 Advair (salmeterol, fluticasone propionate)
 Altabax (retapamulin ointment)
 Altargo (retapamulin)
 Amerge (naratriptan)
 Amoxil (amoxicillin)
 Anectine (suxamethonium chloride)
 Anoro Ellipta (umeclidinium and vilanterol)
 Augmentin (amoxicillin/clavulanate potassium)
 Avamys (fluticasone furoate)
 Avandamet (rosiglitazone/metformin HCl)
 Avandaryl (rosiglitazone maleate and glimepiride)
 Avandia (rosiglitazone maleate)
 Avodart (dutasteride)
 Bactroban (mupirocin)
 Becotide (beclomethasone dipropionate)
 Benlysta (belimumab)
 Betnovate (betamethasone valerate)
 Bexxar (tositumomab)
 BLENREP (belantamab mafodotin)
 Breo (fluticasone furoate, vilanterol)
 Ceftin (cefuroxime axetil)
 Combodart (dutasteride / tamsulosin hydrochloride)
 Coreg (carvedilol)
 Coreg CR (carvedilol phosphate)
 Cutivate (fluticasone propionate)
 Daraprim (pyrimethamine)
 Dectova (zanamivir)
 Dermovate (clobetasol propionate)
 Duodart (dutasteride tamsulosin hydrochloride)
 Dyazide (hydrochlorothiazide/triamterene)
 Eumovate (clobetasone butyrate)
 Flixonase (fluticasone propionate)
 Flixotide (fluticasone propionate)
 Flolan (epoprostenol)
 Flonase (fluticasone propionate)
 Flovent (fluticasone propionate)
 Fortum (ceftazidime)
 Imigran (sumatriptan succinate)
 Imitrex (sumatriptan succinate)
 Incruse Ellipta (umeclidinium)
 Integrilin (eftifibatide)
 Jalyn (dutasteride-tamsulosin hydrochlorid)
 Lamictal (lamotrigine)
 Levitra (vardenafil HCI)
 Lovaza (omega-3-acid ethyl esters)
 Malarone (atovaquone and proguanil hydrochloride)
 Mepron (atovaquone)
 Mivacron (mivacurium chloride)
 Naramig (naratriptan hydrochloride)
 Nimbex (cisatracurium besilate)
 Otosporin ear drops (polymyxin B sulphate, neomycin sulphate, hydrocortisone)
 Pentostam (sodium stibogluconate)
 Prolia (denosumab)
 Relenza (zanamivir)
 Requip (ropinirole hydrochloride)
 Respontin nebules (ipratropium bromide)
 Rythmol (propafenone hydrochloride)
 Rythmol SR (propafenone hydrochloride)
 Seretide (salmeterol xinofoate, fluticasone propionate)
 Serevent (salmeterol xinafoate)
 Seroxat (paroxetine hydrochloride)
 Staxyn (vardenafil hydrochloride)
 Tracrium (atracurium besilate)
 Trelegy (fluticasone furoate, umeclidinium, and vilanterol inhalation powder)
 Treximet (sumatriptan and naproxen sodium)
 Trimovate (clobetasone butyrate)
 Trobalt (retigabine)
 Ultiva (remifentanil hydrochloride)
 Valtrex (valaciclovir hydrochloride)
 Ventolin (salbutamol sulphate)
 Ventolin HFA (albuterol)
 Veramyst (fluticasone furoate)
 Volibris (ambrisentan)
 Wellbutrin (bupropion hydrochloride)
 Wellvone (atovaquone)
 Zantac (ranitidine hydrochloride)
 Zeffix (lamivudine)
 Zejula (niraparib)
 Zinacef (cefuroxime)
 Zinnat (cefuroxime axetil)
 Zovirax (aciclovir)
 Zyban (bupropion hydrochloride)

Vaccines

 Ambirix (for hepatitis A (inactivated) and hepatitis B (rDNA) (HAB) vaccine (adsorbed))
 Bexsero (for meningitis B)
 Boostrix (for tetanus toxoid, reduced diphtheria toxoid and acellular pertussis vaccine, adsorbed)
Cervarix (human Papillomavirus vaccine (types 16, 18) - recombinant, adjuvanted, adsorbed)
Encepur (for tick-borne encephalitis)
Engerix-B (for hepatitis B Vaccine (Recombinant))
Fendrix (hepatitis B (rDNA) vaccine (adjuvanted, adsorbed))
Fluarix (trivalent) & Fluarix (quadrivalent) (seasonal influenza vaccine (3 strain and 4 strain))
FluLaval (trivalent) & FluLaval (quadrivalent) (seasonal influenza vaccine (3 strain and 4 strain))
Havrix (for hepatitis A vaccine, inactivated)
Hepatyrix (for hepatitis A (inactivated, adsorbed) and Typhoid Polysaccharide vaccine)
Hiberix (for haemophilus B conjugate vaccine (tetanus toxoid conjugate))
Infanrix (for diphtheria and tetanus toxoids and acellular pertussis vaccine adsorbed)
Infanrix IPV (for diphtheria, tetanus, pertussis (acellular, component) and poliomyelitis (inactivated) vaccine (adsorbed))
Kinrix (for diphtheria and tetanus toxoids and acellular pertussis adsorbed and inactivated poliovirus vaccine)
Menhibrix (meningococcal groups C and Y and haemophilus b tetanus toxoid conjugate vaccine)
Menitorix (combined Haemophilus influenzae type b and Neisseria meningitidis group C (Hib-MenC) conjugate vaccines)
Menjugate (for meningitis C)
Menveo (for meningitis ACWY)
Pandemrix (for influenza vaccine (split virion, inactivated))
Pediarix (for diphtheria and tetanus toxoids and acellular pertussis adsorbed, hepatitis B (recombinant) and inactivated poliovirus vaccine combined)
Priorix (for measles, mumps and rubella vaccine (live attenuated virus))
Priorix tetra (for measles, mumps, rubella, varicella (chicken pox))
Quinvaxem (for dipheria, Tetanus, whole-cell Pertussis– HiB – HepB)
Rabipur (for rabies)
Rotarix (human rotavirus vaccine, live attenuated)
Shingrix (for Zoster Vaccine Recombinant, Adjuvanted)
Synflorix (pneumococcal polysaccharide conjugate vaccine (adsorbed))
Twinrix (for combined hepatitis A (inactivated virus) and hepatitis B vaccine (genetically derived surface antigen))
Typherix (typhoid vaccine (purified polysaccharide antigen))
Varilrix (for varicella (chicken pox) in healthy adults and adolescents

References 

GlaxoSmithKline products
 
GlaxoSmithKline
Medical lists